Supreme Meeting was a painting by Giacomo Grosso known for its controversial showing at the first Venice Biennale in 1895. The painting depicted several nude women lounging near an open casket. Between its subject matter and color palette, religious leaders attempted to have the work removed. It was instead put in its own room, where it drew crowds and ultimately received the exhibition's best in show prize by popular vote. Upon the Biennale's end, the work was lost in a fire en route to the United States.

References

Further reading

External links 

 Entry in the Biennale archives

1890s paintings
Italian paintings
Venice Biennale exhibitions
Lost paintings